S. chinensis  may refer to:
 Salvia chinensis, an annual plant species native to several provinces in China
 Schisandra chinensis, a deciduous woody vine species native to forests of Northern China and the Russian Far East
 Simmondsia chinensis, the jojoba, a shrub species native to the Sonoran and Mojave deserts of Arizona, California and Mexico
 Sousa chinensis, the Chinese white dolphin, a dolphin species
 Stachyurus chinensis, a flowering plant species in the genus Stachyurus
 Spilopelia chinensis, the spotted dove, a pigeon species found in tropical southern Asia from Pakistan and Sri Lanka east to south China and Southeast Asia

Synonyms 
 Scilla chinensis, a synonym for Barnardia japonica, a plant species

See also
 Chinensis (disambiguation)